The Fleet Commander is a senior Royal Navy post, responsible for the operation, resourcing and training of the ships, submarines and aircraft, and personnel, of the Naval Service. The Vice-Admiral incumbent is required to provide ships, submarines and aircraft ready for operations, and is based at Navy Command Headquarters. 

The post was created in April 2012 following a reorganisation of the Royal Navy and a re-designation of the former role of Commander-in-Chief Fleet.

Responsibilities
The Fleet Commander's purpose is to provide ships, submarines and aircraft ready for any operations that the Government requires.

The Fleet Commander's major subordinates included as of September 2020:
 Commander Operations
 Commander United Kingdom Strike Force
 Director Force Generation - Commodore Steve Moorhouse was promoted to Rear Admiral and became Director 14 January 2022 on the promotion of Martin Connell to Vice Admiral and Connell's appointment as Second Sea Lord.
 Commandant General Royal Marines

The previous post of Assistant Chief of the Naval Staff (Training)/Flag Officer Sea Training was disestablished in May-June 2020. It was superseded by Commander Fleet Operational Sea Training, and in the process the senior Sea Training officer was regraded downwards from a Rear Admiral to a Commodore.

The British Army equivalent is Commander Field Army. The RAF's Deputy Commander (Operations) is the close equivalent of the two positions.

List of Fleet Commanders

Fleet Commander

Deputy Fleet Commander
 April–December 2012: Vice Admiral Sir Philip Jones
 Position Vacant

See also 
 List of serving senior officers of the Royal Navy

References

External links
Fleet Commander

 

Royal Navy appointments